Sendai Hi-Land Raceway was a  motor racing circuit in 12 Hayasaka, Shinkawa, Aoba-ku, Sendai, Miyagi Prefecture, Japan.

In the 1990s, Sendai hosted rounds of the Japanese Touring Car Championship and Japanese Grand Touring Championship. It also hosted All-Japan Formula Three Championship races until 2007.

On October 17, 2010, the Japanese mountain race track hosted the sixth race in the 2010 Super Taikyu Endurance Series.

The raceway was damaged by earthquake in 2011 until it was closed in September 2014. As of today the former raceway is now a solar-power park.

1995 action film Thunderbolt has a car racing scene filmed at Sendai.

Lap records

The official fastest race lap records at the Sendai Hi-Land Raceway are listed as:

References

External links 
Sendai Hi-Land Raceway Official site (Japanese)

Defunct motorsport venues
Motorsport venues in Japan
Drag racing venues
Sports venues in Sendai